Beccles is a market town and civil parish in the English county of Suffolk. Nearby towns include Lowestoft to the east and Great Yarmouth to the north-east. The town lies on the River Waveney on the edge of The Broads National Park.

It had a population at the 2011 census of 10,123. Worlingham is a suburb of Beccles; the combined population is 13,868. Beccles twinned with Petit-Couronne in France in 1978.

History
The name is conjectured to be derived from Becc-Liss* (Brittonic=Small-court). However, also offered is Bece-laes* (Old English=Meadow by Stream), as well as a contraction of Beata Ecclesia, the name of the Christian temple erected c. 960 by the monks of the monastery of Bury. Once a flourishing Anglian riverport, it lies in the Waveney valley and is a popular boating centre. The town was granted its Charter in 1584 by Elizabeth I.

Sir John Leman (died 1632) was a tradesman from Beccles who became Lord Mayor of London.

Long associated with Beccles (including recent mayors) is the Peck family. Among those Pecks who have made a place in history is the Rev. Robert Peck, described by Blomfield in his history of Norfolk as a man with a 'violent schismatic spirit' who led a movement within the church of St Andrew's in nearby Hingham, Norfolk, in opposition to the established Anglicanism of the day. The Puritan Peck was eventually forced to flee to Hingham, Massachusetts, founded by many members of his parish, where he resided for several years, until King Charles I had been executed and Oliver Cromwell had taken the reins of government. Robert Peck then elected to return to Hingham, Norfolk, and resumed as rector of St Andrew's Church. He died in Hingham but left descendants in America, including his brother Joseph Peck, who settled in Rehoboth, Massachusetts. Robert's daughter Ann Peck (16 November 1619 – 30 June 1672) also remained in Massachusetts, and married John Mason, who led colonial forces in the Pequot War.

In 1794, François-René de Chateaubriand, while in exile, taught here French language and literature. He fell in love with Charlotte Ives, daughter of Bungay's reverend. (See: first part of Mémoires d'outre-tombe, book 10, chapter 9 "Charlotte".)

Under the Municipal Corporations Act 1835 the borough was reformed, Beccles retaining municipal borough status until the reorganisation of local government in 1974, when it was merged with surrounding authorities to become Waveney District. The successor civil parish has adopted town status.

Landmarks

Many of the streets in the town centre have the suffix 'gate', for example, Ballygate, Smallgate and Blyburgate. This is derived from the Old Norse for 'street' and is similar to the modern Danish word gade.

The townscape is dominated by the detached 16th century bell tower of St Michael's Church. The church was built in the 14th century but was rebuilt after being badly damaged by fire in 1586. It has a 13th-century octagonal baptismal font and 14th century south porch. Both the church and the tower are Grade I listed buildings.

Catherine Suckling married the Reverend Edmund Nelson, a former curate of Beccles, at the church in 1749. Their son, Horatio Nelson, was born in 1758 in Norfolk. The Suffolk poet George Crabbe married Sarah Elmy at the church in the 18th century.

Opposite the church is Beccles Town Hall, built on the site of the town's market cross. This is at the centre of the Newmarket area, which still features a weekly market.

Beccles Museum is housed in Leman House, a Grade I listed building to the south of the town centre on Ballygate. The building dates from the 16th century and was the original site of the town's Grammar School, named after John Leman who endowed it following his death in 1631.

Beccles Common is an area of common land, to the north west of the town. In the centre of Beccles Common sits a World War Two era Pillbox built in 1940 or 1914.  The area hosts Boney's Island, a man made mound on the common. The name comes from Bonaparte's Island. There are two different sources of the name Boney's Island. the more popular origin is that it was a prisoner of war camp during the Napoleonic wars. The less popular origin is that a large bonfire was lit on the island to celebrate the end of the Napoleonic wars in 1814.

Transport

Bus
A number of bus services link the town with both Norwich and Lowestoft, as well as surrounding villages.
Also, it runs a town service bus, every hour, during the daytime.

Railway
The town is served by Beccles railway station on the East Suffolk Line between Ipswich and Lowestoft. Services run hourly in each direction on weekdays, following the completion of the Beccles rail loop in 2012. This rebuilt the disused island platform and relaid track to allow trains to pass at Beccles, the only point north of Halesworth where this is possible. Services are operated by Abellio Greater Anglia.

The town was formerly the southern terminus of the Yarmouth to Beccles Line, which ran across the River Waveney marshes to Great Yarmouth, and the eastern terminus of the Waveney Valley Line, linking to the Great Eastern Main Line at Tivetshall in Norfolk. Both lines closed, in 1954 and 1966 respectively; the latter as a result of the Beeching Cuts.

Air
Originally built in 1942 as a wartime airfield, it was used as a heliport servicing the North Sea petrochemical industry and is now a base for light aircraft and parachuting.

Cycling
National Cycle Route 1, which runs from London to the Orkney Islands, passes through Beccles. Regional Route 30, which runs between Wells-next-the-Sea and Brandon, and Regional Route 31, from Reedham Ferry to Southwold, also pass through the town.

Road

The town is by-passed to the north by the A146 road between Norwich in Norfolk and Lowestoft in Suffolk. The by-pass was built in the 1980s and the main road previously ran through the town, crossing the River Waveney at the narrow Beccles bridge. The link road between the A146 and the town is George Westwood Way, in memory of a Deputy Mayor, George Lionel Westwood, who fought hard for the construction of the by-pass.

The A145 used to run from the A146 through the town centre to link with the A12 at Blythburgh,  to the south of Beccles. The official route of the road now runs via the Beccles Southern Relief Road to indicate to drivers, particularly those of HGVs, that they can avoid the town; this is intended to make the relief road effective in keeping unnecessary traffic out of the town.

Beccles Southern Relief Road
In 2006, a southern relief road for Beccles was approved, running from a roundabout just south of the town towards Ellough where the A145 connects with an industrial area, before joining with the A146 at North Cove. The completion cost was around £7.0 million and the road forms part of Suffolk County Council traffic management plans. It allows north–south industrial traffic to by-pass the narrow streets of the town centre, reducing congestion and increasing safety and officially opened on 25 September 2018.

Education
Beccles is served by Sir John Leman High School (age 11–18) and SET Beccles School (11–16) for secondary education, both of which admit children from the town and the surrounding area, including from primary schools in Norfolk. Until 2012 a middle school system operated in the town, with most children moving to middle school at age 9 and on to high school at age 13. The Sir John Leman High School dates from 1632 when it was established in the town after the death of John Leman. It was a grammar school between 1914 and 1971.

Three primary schools operate in Beccles providing education from age 5 to 11: Beccles Primary Academy (formerly Crowfoot Primary School); St Benet's Catholic Primary School; and The Albert Pye School which is federated with Ravensmere Infants School (5–8). Children from the town also attend primary school in Worlingham as well as surrounding villages.

Leisure
The annual Beccles Carnival and Family Fun weekend is held during the third weekend in August, which includes the popular Duck Race on the River Waveney.

The town's local newspaper is the weekly Beccles & Bungay Journal, formed in 1933.

Two Scout Association groups, 2nd Beccles and 5th Beccles operate in the town, as do Girlguiding groups. Beccles Sea Cadets and Beccles Royal Marines Cadets run Training Ship Brave and the town is also home to 759 (Beccles) Air Cadets.

Beccles' main football team is Beccles Town F.C., established in 1919. As of the 2022–13 season, they are members of the Anglian Combination Premier Division. Beccles also has a football team called Beccles Caxton F.C., with 'Caxton' being a name commonly found in Beccles, including the social club the 'Caxton Club', the pub the 'Caxton Arms' and the street 'Caxton Road'.

Ellough Park Raceway is south-east of Beccles on the site of the old Ellough airfield. It is a local centre for kart racing.

Notable people
 
 
 Claude Auchinleck, general in India and North Africa during the Second World War;
 Martin Bell, retired journalist and newsreader;
 Tim Buck, General Secretary of the Communist Party of Canada between 1929 and 1962
 Hester Burton, author of children's historical fiction, whose father served as Mayor three times.
Jordan Catchpole, British Paralympic swimmer. He won gold at the 2020 Summer Paralympics
Grantly Dick-Read (1890-1959), obstetrician and a leading advocate of natural childbirth.
 William Fiske, goalkeeper for Blackpool
 David Frost, broadcaster
 Charles Hartley, educationist and the Principal of Royal College, Colombo
 Dorothy Hodgkin, Nobel Prize winner;
 Chris Martin, forward for Bristol City F.C.
 William Aldis Wright, writer, editor and philologist

See also
Beccles Airport
Beccles bell tower
Beccles Lido
Beccles railway station
Beccles Town F.C.
Alan of Beccles

References

External links

 
Market towns in Suffolk
Towns in Suffolk
Civil parishes in Suffolk
Waveney District